is a private junior college, located in the city of Fukushima, Japan. The school is affiliated with the Roman Catholic Church.

History
The Sakura no Seibo was established in 1955 as a women's junior college specializing in home economics. The school was reorganized in 2003 as part of the Ministry of Education's Distinctive University Support Program. It has been affiliated with the Congregation of Notre Dame of Montreal from the Netherlands since 2008. The school offers qualification programs for nursery teachers, dietitians, librarians, kindergarten teaching, junior high school teaching as well as nutrition teaching.

Organization
 School of Life Science
Department of Food & Nutrition
Department of Child welfare
School of English language

External links
 Official website 

Japanese junior colleges
Educational institutions established in 1955
Private universities and colleges in Japan
Universities and colleges in Fukushima Prefecture
1955 establishments in Japan
Women's universities and colleges in Japan
Catholic universities and colleges in Japan
Fukushima (city)